Lockyear College, also known as Lockyear's Business College, was a historic Business college located in downtown Evansville, Indiana.  Originally named Columbian Business College when it opened in 1893 at Fourth and Main streets, the institution became known as Lockyear Business College after Melvin H. Lockyear became in 1897; continuing growth led to the new building on Fifth Street, which was built in 1911, and was a Classical Revival style building..

In 1975, Lockyear opened a branch in Indianapolis, but financial problems forced Lockyear Business College to close in April 1991. The main building was later razed in 1993.

It was listed on the National Register of Historic Places in 1984.

References

School buildings on the National Register of Historic Places in Indiana
Neoclassical architecture in Indiana
School buildings completed in 1911
Buildings and structures in Evansville, Indiana
National Register of Historic Places in Evansville, Indiana
1911 establishments in Indiana